Randall Rocks is a group of rocks situated  off the southwest corner of Miller and Island and trending in a NW-SE direction for , lying in Marguerite Bay off the west coast of Graham Land. The group was first surveyed in 1936 by the British Graham Land Expedition (BGLE) under Rymill. It was resurveyed in 1948-49 by the Falkland Islands Dependencies Survey (FIDS) and named for Terence M. Randall, FIDS radio operator at Stonington Island, 1947–49.

References

Rock formations of Graham Land
Fallières Coast